Tatiana Celia Kennedy Schlossberg (born May 5, 1990) is an American journalist and author. She is a daughter of Caroline Kennedy, the U.S. Ambassador to Australia, and a granddaughter of John F. Kennedy and Jacqueline Kennedy Onassis. A reporter for The New York Times covering climate change, she has also written for The Atlantic. She is the author of the book Inconspicuous Consumption (2019).

Early life and education 
Schlossberg was born at Weill Cornell Medical Center in New York City on May 5, 1990, to designer Edwin Arthur "Ed" Schlossberg and Caroline Kennedy. She is a granddaughter of the U.S. president John F. Kennedy (1917–1963) and First Lady Jacqueline Bouvier Kennedy (1929–1994). Schlossberg has two siblings, Rose and Jack.

She attended Yale University and graduated in 2012. She went on to receive a master's in American History from the University of Oxford in 2014.

Career 
In addition to writing for Times, Schlossberg is the author of Inconspicuous Consumption: The Environmental Impact You Don't Know You Have, released in August 2019 by Grand Central Publishing. She has been a columnist for Bloomberg View and a reporter for Bergen County Record.

Public appearances 
Upon the 50th anniversary of the assassination of John F. Kennedy in 2013, Schlossberg delivered remarks and took part in a ceremonial wreath-laying ceremony at the memorial at Runnymede, in the English county of Surrey, alongside U.S. Ambassador to the UK Matthew Barzun and Baron Jonathan Hill of the British House of Lords.

Personal life 
On September 9, 2017, Schlossberg married her college boyfriend George Moran in Martha's Vineyard. Their wedding was officiated by former Governor of Massachusetts Deval Patrick. They have one child together, who is the first grandchild of Edwin and Caroline and the first great-grandchild of John and Jacqueline Kennedy.

References 

21st-century American journalists
American women journalists
American non-fiction environmental writers
Yale College alumni
Alumni of the University of Oxford
Writers from New York City
Kennedy family
Living people
1990 births
21st-century American women
American people of Ukrainian-Jewish descent